The Cane Hill Battlefield is a historic district encompassing the battlefield of the Battle of Cane Hill, fought during the American Civil War on November 28, 1862, in and around the site of present-day Cane Hill, Arkansas. The northern section of the battlefield is an agricultural area that is little-altered except for the introduction of new roadways and rural buildings, and the abandonment of old roadway alignments. The southern section is hillier and more wooded, and is altered in similar ways.

The battlefield area was listed on the National Register of Historic Places in 1994.

See also
National Register of Historic Places listings in Washington County, Arkansas

References

Military installations established in 1862
Geography of Washington County, Arkansas
American Civil War battlefields
Arkansas in the American Civil War
1862 establishments in Arkansas
National Register of Historic Places in Washington County, Arkansas
Battlefields of the Trans-Mississippi Theater of the American Civil War
Conflict sites on the National Register of Historic Places in Arkansas
American Civil War on the National Register of Historic Places